The 2017 Texas Southern Tigers football team represented Texas Southern University in the 2017 NCAA Division I FCS football season. The Tigers were led by second-year head coach Michael Haywood and played their home games at a BBVA Compass Stadium in Houston, Texas as members of the West Division of the Southwestern Athletic Conference (SWAC). The Tigers finished the season 2–9, 2–5 in SWAC play to finish in fourth place in the West Division.

Preseason 
The Tigers were picked to finish in fourth place in the West Division.

Schedule

 * Games will air on a tape delayed basis

Game summaries

at Florida A&M

Houston Baptist

at Alabama A&M

Alcorn State

at Kennesaw State

Alabama State

at Grambling State

at Mississippi Valley State

Southern

vs Arkansas–Pine Bluff

Prairie View A&M

References

Texas Southern
Texas Southern Tigers football seasons
Texas Southern Tigers football